Llangian is a small village and former civil parish on the Llŷn Peninsula in the Welsh county of Gwynedd. The parish was abolished in 1934 and divided between Llanengan and Botwnnog.

The village's church of Saint Cian is connected to the Edwards family of Nanhoron.

References

Villages in Gwynedd
Llanengan